Leif Larsen may refer to Leif "Shetlands-Larsen" Larsen (1906–1990), a Norwegian resistance member. It may also refer to:

Leif Larsen (politician) (1898–1978), Norwegian politician, mayor of Bærum
Leif Larsen (1903–1945), who later took the name Leif Larsen Tronstad, Norwegian chemist and resistance member
Leif Larsen (cyclist) (born 1942), Danish cyclist
Leif Holger Larsen (1954–2015), Norwegian diplomat
Leif Olve Dolonen Larsen (born 1975), Norwegian athlete, NFL player and pro boxer